Alex Polizzi: Chefs on Trial is a business documentary show produced by TwoFour productions that first aired on BBC Two on the 20 April 2015 and is presented by Alex Polizzi. The programme sees Alex help various restaurants to help them find a new head chef who are in desperate need of filling the vacancy.

Episodes

Series 1 (2015)

Production Credits 
 Presenter: Alex Polizzi
 Series Producer: Maria Knowles
 Producer: Greg Goff
 Director: Robin Leach
 Director: Stuart Derrick
 Executive Producer: Dan Adamson
 Executive Producer: Rachels Innes-Lumsden

Broadcast
Internationally, the series premiered in Australian on 16 November 2015 on LifeStyle Food.

References

External links
 BBC Chefs on Trial series page
 TwoFour Productions
 Gilpin Hotel Website
 The Minders Ares Website
 Amelies Porthleven Website

2015 British television series debuts
BBC reality television shows